American singer Daya has released one studio album, three extended plays (EPs), twenty-one singles (including three as a featured artist), ten music videos, and two promotional singles. Her debut single "Hide Away" became an international hit, peaking within the top 40 in eight countries including the US. In November 2015, her debut self-titled EP was released. She next featured on The Chainsmokers' "Don't Let Me Down", which also became an international hit, peaking within the top 10 in 20 countries, including the US and the UK, and has sold three million copies worldwide. The follow-up "Sit Still, Look Pretty" peaked at number 28 on the Billboard Hot 100. Her debut studio album Sit Still, Look Pretty was released on October 7, 2016, with the promotional single "Cool". Daya released her third single "Words" on November 15, 2016.

Studio albums

Extended plays

Singles

As lead artist

As featured artist

Promotional singles

Music videos

Other appearances

Notes

References

Discographies of American artists